{{DISPLAYTITLE:C24H36O4}}
The molecular formula C24H36O4 (molar mass: 388.54 g/mol) may refer to:

 Bolandiol dipropionate, or norpropandrolate
 Methandriol diacetate, or methylandrostenediol diacetate

Molecular formulas